There were elections in the provinces in Argentina in 2013, for two governors and 13 provincial legislatures.

Results

Buenos Aires Province

Senate

Deputies

City of Buenos Aires

Deputies

Catamarca

Senate

Deputies

Chaco

Deputies

Jujuy

Deputies

La Rioja

Deputies

Mendoza

Senate

Deputies

San Luis

Senate

Deputies

See also
 2013 Argentine legislative election

External links
 Elecciones 2013 

Provincial elections in Argentina
2013 in Argentina